Manticoceras is a genus of ammonites included in the family Gephuroceratidae. These fast-moving nektonic carnivores lived in the Devonian period, from 382.4 to 376.1 Ma.

Species
 Manticoceras adorfense
 Manticoceras contractum
 Manticoceras drevermanni
 Manticoceras intumescens
 Manticoceras lamed
 Manticoceras nodifer
 Manticoceras simulator
 Manticoceras sinuosum

Distribution
Fossils of species within this genus have been found in the sediments of Germany, Australia, Canada, France, Poland, Spain, the United Kingdom and United States.

References

Ammonitida
Devonian ammonites
Ammonites of Asia
Ammonites of Europe
Ammonites of Australia
Ammonites of North America
Paleozoic life of Ontario